The Long Voyage Home is a four-disc boxed set by Joe Cocker, released in 1995.

Track listing

Disc 1
"With a Little Help from My Friends" – 5:14
"I'll Cry Instead" (Philips single A-side, 1964) – 1:46
"(Those) Precious Words" (Philips single B-side, 1964) – 2:41
"Marjorine" – 2:41
"Bye Bye Blackbird" – 3:32
"Just Like a Woman" – 5:19
"Don't Let Me Be Misunderstood" – 4:43
"Do I Still Figure in Your Life" (live at Cobo Hall, Detroit, Michigan, 1969)† – 3:54
"Feelin' Alright" (live at the Fillmore West, San Francisco, California, 1969)† – 5:00
"I Shall Be Released" (live at the Fillmore West, 1969)† – 5:24
"Something's Coming On" (live at the Fillmore West, 1969)† – 3:41
"I Don't Need No Doctor" (live at the Fillmore West, 1969)† – 11:45
"Let It Be" (live at the Fillmore West, 1969)† – 5:15
"Delta Lady" – 2:52
"She Came in Through the Bathroom Window" – 2:40
"Hitchcock Railway" (live at the Fillmore West, 1969)† – 6:25

Disc 2
"Dear Landlord" (live at Cobo Hall, 1969)† – 7:22
"Darling Be Home Soon" – 4:45
"Something" (live at Cobo Hall, 1969)† – 3:41
"Wake Up Little Susie"† – 4:09
"The Letter" – 4:26
"Space Captain" – 5:01
"Cry Me a River" – 4:00
"Let's Go Get Stoned" – 7:41
"Please Give Peace a Chance" – 4:20
"Blue Medley" – 12:34
"The Weight"† – 6:02
"High Time We Went" – 4:28
"Black-Eyed Blues" – 4:36
"Midnight Rider" – 3:59

Disc 3
"Woman to Woman" – 4:31
"Something to Say"† – 5:26
"She Don't Mind"† – 3:07
"Pardon Me Sir" – 3:16
"Put Out the Light" – 4:13
"I Can Stand a Little Rain" – 3:34
"The Moon Is a Harsh Mistress" – 3:32
"You Are So Beautiful" – 2:44
"Guilty" – 2:49
"I Think It's Going to Rain Today" – 4:00
"Jamaica Say You Will" – 4:16
"The Jealous Kind" – 3:51
"Catfish" – 5:25
"A Song for You" – 6:27
"Fun Time" – 2:42
"I'm So Glad I'm Standing Here Today" – 5:05
"Ruby Lee" – 4:25
"Many Rivers to Cross" – 3:43

Disc 4
"So Good, So Right" – 2:37
"Up Where We Belong" – 3:59
"I Love the Night" – 3:42
"Civilized Man" – 3:56
"Edge of a Dream" – 3:55
"You Can Leave Your Hat On" – 4:18
"Unchain My Heart" – 5:23
"I've Got to Use My Imagination" – 4:22
"I'm Your Man" – 3:55
"When the Night Comes" – 4:49
"Can't Find My Way Home" – 3:30
"Don't Let the Sun Go Down on Me" – 5:33
"You've Got to Hide Your Love Away" – 5:01
"Love Is Alive" – 4:32
"With a Little Help from My Friends" (live at Woodstock '94) – 9:43
 † - Previously unreleased material

References

Joe Cocker compilation albums
1995 compilation albums
A&M Records compilation albums